Sphenomorphus wollastoni  is a species of skink found in Indonesia.

References

wollastoni
Taxa named by George Albert Boulenger
Reptiles described in 1914
Skinks of New Guinea